Last Mountain Lake 80A is a shared Indian reserve in Saskatchewan, used by the Day Star, George Gordon, Kawacatoose, Muscowpetung, Muskowekwan, Pasqua, and Piapot First Nations. It is in Township 21, Range 21, west of the Second Meridian.

The reserve is located on the western shore of Last Mountain Lake, on the west side of Regina Beach. It surrounds Little Arm Bay (50°47′6″N, 105°2′30″W), which is where Arm River flows into the lake.

References

Indian reserves in Saskatchewan
Day Star First Nation
George Gordon First Nation
Piapot Cree Nation
Kawacatoose First Nation
Muscowpetung Saulteaux Nation
Pasqua First Nation